Bjorn Fratangelo was the defending champion but lost in the first round to Nicola Kuhn.

Dominic Stricker won the title after defeating Yoshihito Nishioka 7–5, 6–1 in the final.

Seeds

Draw

Finals

Top half

Bottom half

References

External links
Main draw
Qualifying draw

Cleveland Open - 1
Cleveland Open